Richard atte Mere (fl. 1386–1397), was an English Member of Parliament.

He was a Member (MP) of the Parliament of England for Reigate in 1386 and September 1397. Nothing further has been recorded of him.

References

14th-century births
Year of death missing
English MPs 1386
People from Reigate
English MPs September 1397